The Drummondville Rangers were a junior ice hockey team that played in Drummondville, Quebec, Canada. They originally played in the Quebec Junior Hockey League, but became a founding member of the Quebec Major Junior Hockey League in 1969. They were originally affiliated with the New York Rangers. They played at the Drummondville Civic Centre. The Rangers folded in 1974.

NHL alumni
List of Drummundville Rangers alumni who graduated to play in the National Hockey League. Marcel Dionne is the only former Ranger in the Hockey Hall of Fame.

Michel Archambault
Alain Belanger
Michel Belhumeur
Marcel Dionne
Jean Hamel
Pierre Hamel
Gord Haworth
Yvon Lambert
Claude Larose
Kevin Morrison
Michel Parizeau
Pierre Plante
Michel Plasse

Defunct Quebec Major Junior Hockey League teams
Sport in Drummondville
1969 establishments in Quebec
1974 disestablishments in Quebec
Ice hockey clubs established in 1969
Ice hockey clubs disestablished in 1974